Qanat-e Garm (also Romanized as Qanāt-e Garm) is a village in Heruz Rural District, Kuhsaran District, Ravar County, Kerman Province, Iran. At the 2006 census, its population was 216, in 61 families.

References 

Populated places in Ravar County